Lahnerkopf is a mountain located on the border of Bavaria, Germany and Tyrol, Austria.

Mountains of Bavaria
Mountains of Tyrol (state)
Allgäu Alps
Mountains of the Alps